Narumerpy, New South Wales is a Parish of Ularara County in north west New South Wales.

History
The Parish is in the traditional lands of the Bandjigali and Karenggapa people.
The Burke and Wills expedition were the first Europeans to the area.

Geography
The parish has a Köppen climate classification of BWh (Hot desert).

References

Parishes of Ularara County
Far West (New South Wales)